The Illinois Fighting Illini women's basketball team is an NCAA Division I college basketball team competing in the Big Ten Conference. Home games are played at State Farm Center, located on University of Illinois at Urbana–Champaign's campus in Champaign.

Season-by-season results
Sources:
 B1G 2014-2015 Standings
 B1G Record Book
 Big Ten Women's Basketball Statistics

|-style="background: #ffffdd;"
| colspan="8" align="center" | Big Ten Conference

NCAA tournament results

Coaching history

Source for coaching history

International
Jaelyne Kirkpatrick : 2017 Summer Universiade

See also
 Illinois Fighting Illini men's basketball

References

External links